Liên Sơn may refer to several places in Vietnam, including:

Liên Sơn, Đắk Lắk, a township and capital of Lắk District
Liên Sơn, Bắc Giang, a commune of Tân Yên District
, a commune of Kim Bảng District
, a commune of Lương Sơn District
, a commune of Chi Lăng District
, a commune of Gia Viễn District